Syed Abdul Qadir Gilani is a Pakistani politician who had been a member of the National Assembly of Pakistan from July 2012 to 2013. Previously he had been a member of the Provincial Assembly of the Punjab from June 2008 to July 2012.

Early life and education
He was born on 29 April 1981 in Lahore.

He received the degree of Bachelor of Laws (Hons) in 2003 from the University of Hertfordshire.

Political career
He ran for the seat of the National Assembly of Pakistan from Constituency NA-150 (Multan-III) as a candidate of Pakistan Peoples Party (PPP) in 2008 Pakistani general election but was unsuccessful. He received 43,299 votes and lost the seat to Rana Mahmood-ul-Hassan.

He was elected un-contested to the Provincial Assembly of the Punjab as a candidate of PPP from Constituency PP-295 (Rahimyar Khan-VIII) in June 2008.

He was elected to the National Assembly from Constituency NA-151 (Multan-IV) as a candidate of PPP in by-polls held in July 2012. He received 64,628 votes and defeated Shaukat Hayyat Khan Bosan. 

He ran for the seat of the National Assembly from Constituency NA-151 (Multan-IV) as a candidate of PPP in 2013 Pakistani general election but was unsuccessful. He received 56,858 votes and lost the seat to Sikandar Hayat Khan Bosan who received 96,632 votes. In 2018 he again ran for the seat now NA-154 (old NA-151) but again lost, this time to a PTI candidate Ahmed Hussain Dehar.

References

Living people
1981 births
Politicians from Lahore
Pakistani MNAs 2008–2013
Punjab MPAs 2008–2013
Abdul Kadir